Józef Borzyszkowski (born 6 February 1946, Karsin) is a prolific Polish historian, professor of history at Gdańsk University, and Kashubian activist, who served as chairman of the Kashubian-Pomeranian Association from 1986 to 1992.

He was a senator of the Senate of Poland from 1991 to 1993.

References

Sources
 
 Senate of Poland 
 (German language website)

Bibliography
 Obracht-Prondzyński, C.: The Kashubs today: culture, language, identity [translated by Tomasz Wicherkiewicz].Gdańsk: Instytut Kaszubski, 2007; 

1946 births
Living people
People from Kościerzyna County
Polish people of Kashubian descent
20th-century Polish historians
Polish male non-fiction writers
Members of the Senate of Poland 1991–1993
University of Gdańsk alumni
Academic staff of the University of Gdańsk
Kashubians
21st-century Polish historians